Mona Ambegaonkar (born 5 March 1970) is an Indian actress who works in Hindi films and television. She has featured in over 15 plays, 18 feature films, 38 TV projects, 37 advertising campaigns. She had a minor role in film Hazaar Chaurasi Ki Maa and medical drama Dhadkan (TV series) as Dr. Chitra.

Mona Ambegaonkar plays the lead in the 2018 Hindi feature film Evening Shadows directed by Sridhar Rangayan and produced by Solaris Pictures.  She plays the role of Vasudha, a South Indian woman who is confronted by the truth of her son Kartik (Devansh Doshi) being gay. Being from a traditional society and bound within a patriarchal family, she finds it very difficult to accept her son's sexuality. She also is scared that her strict husband Damodar (played by eminent actor Ananth Narayan Mahadevan) will find out about the truth.
She won the award for Best Performance in a Supporting Role at Out At The Movies, Winston-Salem for her role in the film Evening Shadows.

Television
Thoda sa aasman as an aspiring airhostess
Dekh Bhai Dekh (1993) as Neeru
Saanp-Sedhi (1994) as a co-host with Mohan Kapoor
Kya Baat Hai (1997) as Mona
C.I.D. (2004-2005) as Dr. Anjalika Deshmukh
Aahat (1995-2001) as episodic role
Episode 1.18-1.19 (1995) as Karuna 
Episode 1.108-1.109 (1997) as Raksha 
Episode 1.132-1.133 (1998) as Shilpa 
Episode 1.176-1.177 (1999) as Anju 
Episode 1.268-1.269 (2001) as Reena 
Dhadkan as Dr. Chitra Sheshadri
Nyaay (1999-2000) as Advocate Varsha
Shubh Mangal Savadhan (2003) as Maria
Maryada: Lekin Kab Tak
Amber Dhara (2007-2008) as Lata, Amber & Dhara's mother
Kaala Teeka as Kalyani Jha (main antagonist)
Baat Hamari Pakki Hai as Usha Sharma
Life Sahi Hai (2016-2018) as Jasjit's mother

Filmography

Films

Web series

References

External links
 
 

Living people
Indian television actresses
20th-century Indian actresses
21st-century Indian actresses
Indian soap opera actresses
1970 births